Giuseppe Mazzuoli may refer to:

 Giuseppe Mazzuoli (c. 1536 – 1589), Renaissance painter known as il Bastaruolo
 Giuseppe Mazzuoli (1644–1725), sculptor of Rome
 Giuseppe Maria Mazzuoli, an italian sculptor and stucco artist